Renhe District is a district of the city of Panzhihua, Sichuan Province, China, bordering Yunnan province to the south and west.

Climate

References

Districts of Sichuan
Panzhihua